The Plakobranchacea are a taxonomic family of sea slugs, marine gastropod molluscs in the clade Sacoglossa.

Taxonomy
Superfamily Plakobranchoidea
Family Boselliidae
Family Plakobranchidae
Family Platyhedylidae
Superfamily Limapontioidea
Family Caliphyllidae
Family Hermaeidae
Family Limapontiidae

References

 
Sacoglossa